The 1962 season was the first season of national competitive association football in Australia and 79th overall. The Australian Soccer Association introduced their Australia Cup, a knockout tournament.

Cup competitions

Australia Cup

The competition began on 2 November 1962. Sixteen clubs had entered the competition with the final two clubs Yugal and St George-Budapest qualifying for the Final. Yugal won the final 8–1 with four goals from Tiko Jelisavčić, two goals from Eric Schwarts and one goal each for Tony Nincevich and Slavko Pacanin.

Final

References

External links
 Football Federation Australia official website

1962 in Australian soccer
Seasons in Australian soccer